John Fortescue may refer to:

 Sir John Fortescue (judge) (c. 1394–1479), English lawyer and judge, MP for Tavistock, Totnes, Plympton Erle and Wiltshire
 Sir John Fortescue of Salden (1531/1533–1607), third Chancellor of the Exchequer of England
 John Fortescue Aland, 1st Baron Fortescue of Credan (1670–1746), English jurist
 John Fortescue (MP for Barnstaple) (1819–1859), British MP
 Sir John Fortescue (historian) (1859–1933), British statesman and military historian
 John Fortescue (Captain of Meaux), English landowner and administrator
 John Inglett-Fortescue